Fotbal Club Fălești is a Moldovan football club based in Fălești. They play in the Moldovan Liga 1, the second tier of Moldovan football.

History
The club was founded in 1991 as FC Flacăra Fălești. In July 2013, it was renamed FC Fălești. The club played in the third tier until it was promoted to the second tier in 2019. In 2021, the club was relegated back to the third tier, but only one year later it was once again promoted to the second tier.

Stadium
The club plays its home matches at the Fălești Stadium, which was renovated in 2022. It has a capacity of 4,300 seats. The club previously played its home matches in Bălți.

Honours
Divizia B
Winners (2): 2019, 2021–22

References

External links
FC Fălești on Global Sports Archive
FC Fălești on Soccerway

Football clubs in Moldova
Association football clubs established in 1991
1991 establishments in Moldova